Neoheterophrictus is a genus of tarantula in the family Theraphosidae. It comprises 8 species, all found in India.

Characteristics 
Neoheterophrictus is similar to Heterophrictus and Plesiophrictus, however the females differ by having a different spermathecae structure, which have two receptacles with many lobes/termini at the end. Males are distinguished from Plesiophrictus by the absence of a tegular keel on the male palpal bulb. It occurs in the Western Ghats, India.

Etymology 
The name is a combination of two words neo and heterophrictus, neo in Latin meaning "new" and Heterophrictus being a genus name within the family Theraphosidae.

Species 
, the World Spider Catalog recognized 8 species. All are restricted to India.

 Neoheterophrictus amboli Mirza & Sanap, 2014 - India
 Neoheterophrictus bhori (Gravely, 1915) - India
 Neoheterophrictus chimminiensis Sunil Jose, 2020 - India
 Neoheterophrictus crurofulvus Siliwal, Gupta & Raven, 2012 (type) - India
 Neoheterophrictus madraspatanus (Gravely, 1935) - India
 Neoheterophrictus sahyadri Siliwal, Gupta & Raven, 2012 - India
 Neoheterophrictus smithi Mirza, Bhosale & Sanap, 2014 - India
 Neoheterophrictus uttarakannada Siliwal, Gupta & Raven, 2012 - India

References 

Theraphosidae
Spiders of the Indian subcontinent
Theraphosidae genera